Starburst is a British man-portable surface-to-air missile produced by Shorts Missile Systems of Belfast (since 2002 known as Thales Air Defence). It was used by the British Army (as Javelin S15), Malaysian Armed Forces, and in the Canadian Army as the Javelin until 2005. It can be fired from the shoulder or from a launcher known as Starburst LML – Lightweight Multiple Launcher.

It has been replaced in British service by the Starstreak missile.

Development

The missile was a development of Javelin missile, retaining the Javelin missile body but replacing the radio command system with a laser guidance system similar to that used by the Starstreak missile that was already under development. This is much more difficult to jam than the radio based system used by Javelin. It entered service in 1990, and was deployed to protect British troops during the 1991 Gulf War.

Variants
 Starburst LML (Lightweight multiple launcher)
 Starburst VML (Vehicle multiple launcher)
 Starburst NML (Naval multiple launcher)
 Starburst starlite thermal imager
 Starburst SR2000

Operators

 Kuwait Air Force
 Malaysian Army and Royal Malaysian Air Force: To be replaced by the Starstreak.

 British Army: Replaced by Starstreak.

See also
 Anza
 Misagh-2
 Qaem

References

 Jane's Land-Based Air Defence 2005–2006, 
 

Surface-to-air missiles of the United Kingdom
Military equipment introduced in the 1990s
Short Brothers missiles